This is David Lander is a TV show that parodies Roger Cook style doorstepping investigative journalism shows, starring Stephen Fry as David Lander and written by Tony Sarchet.

It began as the BBC Radio 4 show Delve Special, which became this six-part Channel 4 series in 1988.

This is David Harper
For the 1990 series, Stephen Fry was too busy with other work commitments and the series was renamed This is David Harper with Tony Slattery replacing Fry's character with a minor name-change.

External links
 
Delve Special/This Is David Lander/This Is David Harper information at the BBC

Channel 4 original programming
Television series based on radio series
Television series by Hat Trick Productions
1988 British television series debuts
1990 British television series endings
1980s British comedy television series
1990s British comedy television series
British parody television series
English-language television shows